Petar Jokić (born 12 July 1991) is a Serbian professional basketball player who last played for KK Strumica.

References

External links 
 Profile at eurobasket.com
  at fiba.com

1991 births
Living people
Serbian men's basketball players
Forwards (basketball)
KK Sloga players